Northern Pannonia may refer to:

 in geography, northern regions of the Pannonian Basin
 Pannonia Superior, the first Roman northern Pannonia
 in ancient history, northern regions of the Roman Province of Pannonia, including:
 late Roman Province of Pannonia Prima, and
 late Roman Province of Pannonia Valeria
 in medieval history, northern regions of the Frankish Avar March and later March of Pannonia, including the Slavic southern pannonian Balaton Principality (see later Pannonia Superior)

See also
 Southern Pannonia (disambiguation)